Big Timber is a city in, and the county seat of Sweet Grass County, Montana, United States. The population was 1,650 at the 2020 census.

Big Timber takes its name from Big Timber Creek, which was named by William Clark because of the large cottonwood trees. The post office was established in 1880, closed, then reopened in 1882 with Ella Burns as postmaster. As a stop on the Northern Pacific Railroad, Big Timber became a major wool-shipping depot. It became the county seat in 1895. A fire in 1908 destroyed half the commercial buildings and a third of the residential homes.

Geography
Big Timber is located at  (45.833224, -109.950361).

Climate
Big Timber has a cool semi-arid climate (Köppen BSk) bordering on a humid continental climate (Dfb). Although winters can be frigid, frequent chinook winds will raise temperatures above  on an average twenty days between December and February, and have raised them to or above  on ten occasions during these months since 1894. The chinooks mean Big Timber's 31.3 days per year failing to top freezing is among the fewest in Montana, with the average window for such maxima being from November 11 to March 18. The average window for zero temperatures is from December 4 to February 25.

Spring is typically windy with temperatures nearly so variable as in winter: the last frost typically arrives on May 19, but temperatures have reached  as early as March 22 of 1928 and have fallen to zero Fahrenheit as late as April 13, 1928 and April 12, 1997. Late in spring thunderstorms increase in frequency and during late spring and early summer these provide most of Big Timber's annual precipitation.

The fall season is usually short and variable, with snow occasionally falling in September, but at other times hot weather can extend into October or even November.

Demographics

2010 census
As of the census of 2010, there were 1,641 people, 751 households, and 429 families residing in the city. The racial makeup of the city was 95.9% White, 0.1% African American, 0.5% Native American, 0.7% Asian, 0.1% Pacific Islander, 0.5% from other races, and 2.3% from two or more races. Hispanic or Latino of any race were 1.8% of the population.

There were 751 households, of which 28.0% had children under the age of 18 living with them, 43.5% were married couples living together, 9.5% had a female householder with no husband present, 4.1% had a male householder with no wife present, and 42.9% were non-families. 38.7% of all households were made up of individuals, and 20.9% had someone living alone who was 65 years of age or older. The average household size was 2.13 and the average family size was 2.82.

The median age in the city was 45.5 years. 23.1% of residents were under the age of 18; 5.8% were between the ages of 18 and 24; 20.8% were from 25 to 44; 25.2% were from 45 to 64; and 25.2% were 65 years of age or older. The gender makeup of the city was 48.5% male and 51.5% female.

2000 census
As of the census of 2000, there were 1,650 people, 711 households, and 430 families residing in the city. The population density was 1,752.6 people per square mile (677.7/km2). There were 812 housing units at an average density of 862.5 per square mile (333.5/km2). The racial makeup of the city was 96.61% White, 0.79% Native American, 0.30% Asian, 0.06% Pacific Islander, 0.73% from other races, and 1.52% from two or more races. Hispanic or Latino of any race were 1.70% of the population.

There were 711 households, out of which 27.8% had children under the age of 18 living with them, 52.2% were married couples living together, 5.5% had a female householder with no husband present, and 39.5% were non-families. 34.7% of all households were made up of individuals, and 19.4% had someone living alone who was 65 years of age or older. The average household size was 2.24 and the average family size was 2.92.

In the city, the population was spread out, with 23.7% under the age of 18, 6.6% from 18 to 24, 23.2% from 25 to 44, 23.7% from 45 to 64, and 22.8% who were 65 years of age or older. The median age was 42 years. For every 100 females there were 96.4 males. For every 100 females age 18 and over, there were 91.9 males.

The median income for a household in the city was $30,595, and the median income for a family was $38,869. Males had a median income of $29,000 versus $17,596 for females. The per capita income for the city was $17,569. About 9.3% of families and 10.8% of the population were below the poverty line, including 15.9% of those under age 18 and 7.6% of those age 65 or over.

Infrastructure
Big Timber Airport is a public use airport located 3 miles southwest of town.

Education
Sweet Grass County High School provides public high school education in Big Timber. They are known as the Sheepherders.

Carnegie Public Library serves the Big Timber area.

Notable people

 Orvin B. Fjare, United States Congressman from Montana
 Judy Martz, 22nd Governor of Montana
 Bobby Hauck, head football coach of the University of Montana football team
Michael Keaton, Academy Award-nominated actor
Speed Langworthy, lyricist, advertising account executive, newspaper magnate, and international relations.

See also
List of cities and towns in Montana

References

External links

 Big Timber/Sweet Grass County Chamber of Commerce
 The Big Timber Pioneer - Local newspaper

Cities in Sweet Grass County, Montana
County seats in Montana
Cities in Montana